Nílton de Sordi (14 February 1931 – 24 August 2013), sometimes known as just De Sordi, was a Brazilian footballer who played as a defender.

Career
De Sordi earned 22 caps for the Brazil national team. He was part of the 1958 FIFA World Cup winning squad, and played in all matches except the final. During his club career, he played for XV de Piracicaba-SP and São Paulo.

Death
De Sordi died of multiple organ failure on 24 August 2013 in Bandeirantes, Brazil.

References

1931 births
2013 deaths
People from Piracicaba
Brazilian footballers
Footballers from São Paulo (state)
Association football defenders
Esporte Clube XV de Novembro (Piracicaba) players
São Paulo FC players
Brazil international footballers
1958 FIFA World Cup players
FIFA World Cup-winning players
Deaths from multiple organ failure